Arenal Huetar Norte Conservation Area (ACAHN), is an administrative area which is managed by SINAC for the purposes of conservation in the northern part of Costa Rica. It contains a national park, a forest reserve and number of wildlife refuges.

Protected areas
Arenal Volcano National Park
Arenal Volcano Emergency Forest Reserve
Caño Negro Wildlife Refuge
Border Corridor Wildlife Refuge
Juan Castro Blanco National Park
Laguna Las Camelias Wildlife Refuge
Maquenque National Wildlife Refuge

References

External links 
 

Conservation Areas of Costa Rica